The Polyanthos (December 1805 – September 1814) was a monthly literary magazine published in Boston, Massachusetts, by Joseph Tinker Buckingham. Contributors of essays, biographical articles and other literature included Wilkes Allen, Rev. John Eliot (of New North Church), John Lathrop, Jr., Samuel Louder, John Lovering, John Randall, Solomon Stoddard, Royall Tyler, Samuel A. Wells, and Rufus Wyman. Buckingham also wrote theatre reviews in each issue. Most issues featured an engraving, often a portrait by Samuel Harris (ca.1784-1810) or a song. The magazine ceased in 1814 "for the ungrateful or undiscerning public, — notwithstanding the expressed flattery of their taste and confidence in their liberality, — suffered it to wither and die."

Images
Published in Polyanthos

References

Further reading

  v.1 (1805-1806); v.2 (1806); v.3; v.4 (1806-1807); new series v.1 (1812); v.2 (June–September 1812); v.3 (October 1813-March 1814); v.4 (April–September 1814).

19th century in Boston
1810s in the United States
1800s in the United States
1805 establishments in Massachusetts
1814 disestablishments in Massachusetts
Monthly magazines published in the United States
Cultural history of Boston
Defunct literary magazines published in the United States
Magazines established in 1805
Magazines disestablished in 1814
Magazines published in Boston